The following lists events that happened during 2004 in the Democratic Republic of São Tomé and Príncipe.

Incumbents
President: Fradique de Menezes
Prime Minister: Maria das Neves (until 18 September), Damião Vaz d'Almeida (from 18 September)

Events
15 September: Maria das Neves was dismissed from the post as Prime Minister
18 September: Damião Vaz d'Almeida sworn in as Prime Minister succeeding Maria das Neves

Sports
GD Os Operários won the São Tomé and Príncipe Football Championship

References

 
Years of the 21st century in São Tomé and Príncipe
2000s in São Tomé and Príncipe
São Tomé and Príncipe
São Tomé and Príncipe